The Barranco de Badajoz or Chamoco is a ravine on the island of Tenerife (Canary Islands, Spain), in the province of Santa Cruz de Tenerife, part of the municipality of Güímar in the southeast of the island.

Archeology 
The most significant prehistoric remains on the island were found in this area, demonstrating the aboriginal guanche activity. In addition, several Guanche mummies have been found here, so the place is important archaeologically.

Legends 
There are many legends about experiences people have had who have visited and stayed mainly at night in the Barranco de Badajoz. Many people claim to have seen apparitions of angelic beings and to have experienced various paranormal phenomena,  ranging from UFO's to poltergeists and orbs, balls of fire, appearances of the legendary Tibicena, ritual satanic and other spectral phenomena. The area has been described as similar to the Bridgewater Triangle (Massachusetts) in the United States.

References

External links 
 Official Website

Ravines of the Canary Islands
Angelic apparitions
Geography of Tenerife
Paranormal places in Spain
Spanish legends